The Treason Felony Act 1848 (11 & 12 Vict. c. 12) is an Act of the Parliament of the United Kingdom of Great Britain and Ireland. Parts of the Act are still in force. It is a law which protects the King and the Crown.

The offences in the Act were originally high treason under the Sedition Act 1661 (later the Treason Act 1795), and consequently the penalty was death. However it was found that juries were often reluctant to convict people of capital crimes, and it was thought that the conviction rate might increase if the sentence was reduced to exile to the penal colonies in Australia (the penalty is now life imprisonment). Consequently, in 1848 three categories of treason (all derived from the 1795 Act) were reduced to felonies. (This occurred during a period when the death penalty in the United Kingdom was being abolished for a great many offences.) The Act does not prevent prosecutors from charging somebody with treason instead of treason felony if the same conduct amounts to both offences.

It is treason felony to "compass, imagine, invent, devise, or intend":
 to deprive the Sovereign of his crown,
 to levy war against the Sovereign, or
 to "move or stir" any foreigner to invade the United Kingdom or any other country belonging to the Sovereign.

Punishment and procedure 

Treason felony is an indictable-only offence. It is punishable with imprisonment for life or any shorter term.

Despite the name, it is no longer a felony, as the distinction between felony and misdemeanour was abolished by the Criminal Law Act 1967.

In Northern Ireland, a person charged with treason felony may not be admitted to bail except by order of the High Court or of the Secretary of State.

Scottish Parliament 

Treason felony is a reserved matter on which the Scottish Parliament cannot legislate.

Text 

The full text of the Act is available online. The wording of section 3 of the Act is:

The ellipses represent words that have subsequently been repealed.

Section 10 of the Interpretation Act 1978 says that references to the Sovereign reigning at the time of the passing of the Treason Felony Act are to be construed as references to the Sovereign for the time being.

Repealed provisions 
Penal transportation was abolished in 1868, leaving life imprisonment as the maximum sentence.

Section 4 of the Act contained strict rules about treason felony when committed only by speaking. A conviction required a confession in open court, or the evidence of two witnesses to prove the words spoken. Also a prosecution had to be brought within six days of the offence. Section 4 was repealed by the Statute Law Revision Act 1891.

Discussions 
In 2001, The Guardian newspaper mounted an unsuccessful legal challenge to the Act in the High Court, alleging that the act "makes it a criminal offence, punishable by life imprisonment, to advocate abolition of the monarchy in print, even by peaceful means". They sought a declaration that the Human Rights Act 1998 had altered its meaning so that only violent conduct was criminal. The court held that this was a hypothetical question that did not deserve an answer, since The Guardian was not being prosecuted. The case eventually went to the House of Lords on appeal in 2003. In a unanimous judgement, the Lords agreed that the litigation was unnecessary; but the judges nevertheless agreed with Lord Steyn's view that
[T]he part of section 3 of the 1848 Act which appears to criminalise the advocacy of republicanism is a relic of a bygone age and does not fit into the fabric of our modern legal system. The idea that section 3 could survive scrutiny under the Human Rights Act is unreal.

In December 2013, the Ministry of Justice said that Section 3 of the Act, which had made it an offence punishable by life imprisonment to print, or otherwise "by any overt act or deed" to support the abolition of the monarchy or to "imagine, invent, devise, or intend to deprive or depose" the monarch, had been repealed in early 2013, without publicity. However, the Government later stated that the announcement that it had been repealed was wrong, and that it was still on the statute book.

Relevant cases 
R v. Mitchel (1848) 7 State Tr. N.S. 599
R v. Cuffey (1848) 7 State Tr. N.S. 467, 12 JP 648
R v. Meany (1867) 10 Cox CC 506, IR 1 CL 500
Mulcahy v. R (1868) LR 3 HL 306
R v. Davitt (1870) 11 Cox CC 676
R v. Deasy (1883) 15 Cox CC 334

The last reported case under the Act in the United Kingdom was in 1883, although the Act was used in Australia in 1916 to prosecute the "Sydney Twelve".

In 1972 three Irish republicans Joseph Callinan, Louis Marcantonio and Thomas Quinn were initially charged with treason felony, although this was later dropped in favour of lesser charges of seditious utterances.

Parliamentary debates 
Hansard (House of Commons), 10 April 1848, vol. 98, col. 20 - 59 (first reading)
Hansard (House of Commons), 10 April 1848, vol. 98, col. 74 - 135 (second reading)
Hansard (House of Commons), 11 April 1848, vol. 98, col. 153 - 175 (motion to go into committee)
Hansard (House of Commons), 12 April 1848, vol. 98, col. 223 - 259 (motion to go into committee)
Hansard (House of Commons), 14 April 1848, vol. 98, col. 341 - 379 (committee)
Hansard (House of Commons), 17 April 1848, vol. 98, col. 417 - 431 (report)
Hansard (House of Commons), 18 April 1848, vol. 98, col. 453 - 479 (third reading)
Hansard (House of Lords), 18 April 1848, vol. 98, col. 447 (first reading)
Hansard (House of Lords), 19 April 1848, vol. 98, col. 486 - 507 (second reading)
Hansard (House of Lords), 20 April 1848, vol. 98, col. 534 - 537 (third reading)
Hansard (House of Lords), 22 April 1848, vol. 98 (royal assent)

See also 
John Mitchel, the first person convicted of treason felony
Michael Davitt and the Sydney Twelve, people convicted of treason felony
John Jervis (judge), attorney-general who drafted the Act
Capital punishment in the United Kingdom
High treason in the United Kingdom
Treason Act
Republicanism in the United Kingdom

References 
Halsbury's Laws of England, 4th Edition, 2006 reissue, Volume 11(1), Paragraph 367

External links 
Lords halt challenge to treason law - The Guardian, Thursday 26 June 2003
House of Lords judgement - UK Parliament website

1848 in British law
United Kingdom Acts of Parliament 1848
Republicanism in the United Kingdom
English criminal law
Treason in the United Kingdom
Lèse-majesté